Hamilton "Ham" Coolidge (September 1, 1895 – October 27, 1918), was an American pursuit pilot, flying ace in World War I, and recipient of the Distinguished Service Cross.

Biography
Coolidge was the great-great-great grandson of U.S. President Thomas Jefferson and the best friend of Quentin Roosevelt, the youngest son of President Theodore Roosevelt. Ham Coolidge and Quentin Roosevelt attended Groton School together, attended Harvard together, joined the United States Army Air Service and served together with the 1st Pursuit Group in France. They were killed in action within a few months of each other in 1918.

Coolidge dropped out of Harvard College during his sophomore year to join the U.S. Army Air Service. He was one of ten Harvard undergraduates accepted from a field of forty applicants for training at the Curtiss Flying School in Buffalo, New York in July 1916.

A private with the Aviation Section, U.S. Signal Corps, stationed in Miami, Florida when the United States entered the war, Coolidge was sent to the School of Military Aeronautics at the Massachusetts Institute of Technology on June 5, 1917. He embarked for France on July 23, 1917 and was commissioned first lieutenant on September 29, 1917. After serving as a test pilot at Issoudun, he was assigned to the 94th Aero Squadron, commanded by Eddie Rickenbacker, on June 16, 1918. He was promoted to captain on October 3, 1918.

On October 27, 1918, he was killed in action, his SPAD S.XIII taking a direct hit from a German anti-aircraft shell near Grandpré, Ardennes. He had eight confirmed "kills" when he was shot down. Like Quentin Roosevelt, he was posthumously awarded an A.B. (War Degree), Harvard Class of 1919.

Hamilton Coolidge was the great-great-great grandson of U.S. President Thomas Jefferson. His father, Joseph Randolph Coolidge III, was descended from Martha Jefferson Randolph (daughter of the president, who married into the Randolph family of Virginia).

See also

 List of World War I flying aces from the United States

References

Bibliography
A brief biography with citations
Letters of An American Airman: The War Record of Captain Hamilton Coolidge (Boston, 1919)

1895 births
1918 deaths
American World War I flying aces
American military personnel killed in World War I
Aviators from Massachusetts
Groton School alumni
People from Brookline, Massachusetts
Recipients of the Distinguished Service Cross (United States)
United States Army officers
Military personnel from Massachusetts